Reverend Bizarre / Orodruin is a split EP by the bands Reverend Bizarre and Orodruin, released in 2004 on Metal Coven Records.

Track listing
Side A
"Demons Annoying Me" - Reverend Bizarre - 15:03
Side B
"Ascending Damnation" - Orodruin - 6:11
"Master, the Tempest Is Raging" - Orodruin - 8:21

References

Reverend Bizarre albums
2004 EPs